Lac d'Esparron is an artificial reservoir, filled in 1967 following the construction of the hydroelectric dam in Gréoux on the course of the Verdon river. It is located near the village of Esparron-de-Verdon in the French department of Alpes-de-Haute-Provence in the region Provence-Alpes-Côte d'Azur.

It is the last of five reservoirs established on the Verdon since 1963; of these, the lake of Esparron is the third largest by surface area after the lakes of Sainte-Croix and Castillon. Its creation flooded the entire plain that overlooked Esparron-de-Verdon, and raised the level of the river for 8 km upstream from the lake. This had the consequence of cutting the old road leading to Saint-Julien in the Var department and engulfing the bridge, the only human building drowned at the bottom of this lake.

The maximum depth of 55 m is measured directly above the dam.

Lake Esparron is an important summer tourism center, frequented for water recreation and for fishing. As on all the waters of the Verdon, the use of motor boats is prohibited, giving free rein to electric boats and sailing.

The remains of the old Verdon canal are on the shore facing the village of Esparron-de-Verdon. On the same shore, near the St Julien Beach, is the first of two imposing water intakes that help feed the Provence canal. The water then passes through the Galerie des Maurras and other open galleries and canals to reach the Canal de Provence near Rians.

Esparron
Landforms of Alpes-de-Haute-Provence